Carlos Daniel Meza Villa (born 31 October 2002) is a Peruvian footballer who plays as a midfielder for Cienciano.

Career statistics

Club

Notes

References

2002 births
Living people
Peruvian footballers
Peru youth international footballers
Association football midfielders
Peruvian Primera División players
Sporting Cristal footballers
Carlos A. Mannucci players